The 2014 UEFS Futsal Men's Championship was the 11th UEFS futsal European championship held in the Czech Republic from 19 May to 23 May, with 9 national teams.

European Union of Futsal (UEFS) organizes the European Championship biennially.

First round

Group A

Group B

Group С

Final round

5th-8th place

Final ranking

UEFS Futsal Men's Championship
UEFS
International futsal competitions hosted by the Czech Republic
2013–14 in Czech football